The 1963 Belgian Grand Prix was a Formula One motor race, held at Spa-Francorchamps on 9 June 1963. It was race 2 of 10 in both the 1963 World Championship of Drivers and the 1963 International Cup for Formula One Manufacturers. Jim Clark won the race in extremely wet and rainy conditions. After starting eighth on the grid Clark passed all of the cars in front of him, including early leader Graham Hill. At the end of the race, Clark had not only lapped the entire field except for Bruce McLaren, but the margin to the second-placed Cooper driver was almost five minutes.  The Scot's performance was made even more impressive by the fact that gearbox issues meant that he had to hold his gear lever in place, thus driving one-handed, whenever fifth gear was selected on this high-speed circuit. Given the rainy conditions, Clark eventually chose not to engage fifth gear at all, leaving him with only four gears. This would be the first of seven victories for Clark and Team Lotus that year.

Classification

Qualifying

Race

Championship standings after the race

Drivers' Championship standings

Constructors' Championship standings

 Notes: Only the top five positions are included for both sets of standings.

References

Belgian Grand Prix
Belgian Grand Prix
Grand Prix
June 1963 sports events in Europe